George Brown (1912-1979) was born in Nottingham, England. Known primarily as a motorcycle racer, he has been called " the father of British sprinting". Brown raced a variety of bikes but is most closely associated with the Vincent brand. For a time he worked at Vincent, where he headed up their Experimental department and raced the factory-backed single and V-twin bikes. Brown left Vincent to establish his own motorcycle shop and as a sideline built high-performance sprint bikes that he rode to several national and international records.

Biography

Early years
George Brown was born 22 February 1912 in Nottingham, England, and grew up in Colwick, Nottinghamshire. He attended Nottingham High School and planned a career in law as a solicitor.

Brown's grandfather ran a cycle shop, and his father owned several motorcycles. Brown's father eventually bought a cycle shop in Harrow, where George spent time repairing a wide variety of motorcycles. He later inherited brother Cliff's 250 cc AJS.

At the beginning of the 1930s Brown drove a lorry and worked for Raleigh, where his father had earlier been in the Experimental Department. In 1933 Brown went to the Vincent works at Stevenage and asked Vincent founder Philip Conrad Vincent (PCV) for a job. He was given a position in the service department, where he rebuilt second-hand bikes taken in exchange for new Vincents. By 1934 Brown had moved into the factory, where he was soon promoted to the Test and Special bike department.

Due to Brown's not being a member of the British Motorcycle Racing Club (BMCRC), he was denied the usual Gold Star for the feat. During this period he was also riding a 350 cc Velocette at grass track events.

WW II and post-war at Vincent
At the outbreak of World War II Vincent shut down motorcycle manufacturing and converted to wartime production. Brown went to work for Percival Aircraft in Luton, building Mosquitos as assembly foreman. He applied to the RAF but his application was declined due to his being employed in a reserved occupation at Percival. When the war ended in 1945 Brown stayed at Percival for a while, but quickly got involved with Vincent again. After his release from war work he immediately returned to Vincent. Brown also married in 1946.

After the war Brown was racing privately when he was approached by Joe Craig to ride a Norton at the Isle of Man TT. Brown turned him down, and the ride went to John Surtees. Vincent opened a showroom in Chesterfield in the north, and Brown worked there as sales manager for a time before returning to Stevenage.

During the 1946 racing season, Brown recorded 6 first and 5 second places on a modified Comet that was later known as the Cadwell Special. In 1947 he began racing a special Rapide that was later named Gunga Din.

Brown made his first appearance at the Isle of Man in 1948 in the Clubmans' TT. He was leading after 3 laps when he ran out of petrol. Brown then pushed his bike the remaining 6 miles, and still managed a sixth-place finish. Later that same year Brown crashed badly at Eppynt trying to avoid a young girl who had fallen off the banking onto the track.

In 1951 Brown was approached by AJS with an offer to ride for them, but he turned them down as he had with Norton earlier. He continued to ride Vincents in road racing and trials events.

Post-Vincent
Brown left Vincent in 1951. He started his own motorcycle business in part of a local Ford dealership. He was an agent for Francis-Barnett, Norman and Velocette motorcycles, as well as taking on special projects, such as developing a Trials bike for Norman. Brown also began building his own motorcycles for road racing and, later, for sprinting.

In his first outing at the TT after leaving Vincent in 1951 he placed fourth on an AJS. Returning in 1952 he placed sixth on an AJS in the Junior event and seventh on a Norton in the Senior race.

At this time Brown expanded his business, taking over a shop across the road from the old Vincent works in the High Street in the old town in Stevenage. This was also when he became an agent for Vincent motorcycles.

In 1953 Brown was seriously injured at the Junior TT when he collided with the wreckage of Leslie Graham's MV Agusta. After this Brown essentially retired from road racing, but continued to appear in hill climbs and sprints.

In 1958 Brown was one of the people involved in the formation of the National Sprint Association. Brown served as a vice-president until he succeeded Donald Campbell as president in 1967.

In 1961 Brown staged an attempt on the World Solo Record, then held by Albino Milani. Over two days, 19 and 20 August, Brown ran both his Nero bike and an Ariel Arrow at Thurleigh field. Brown took three British records for both standing- and flying-start kilometre on the Ariel. Avon Rubber supplied new slick tyres for Nero; the first use of such tyres in Britain. On Nero, Brown took the World Record for the Standing-start Kilometre for 1000 cc machines.

The British Drag Racing Association was formed in 1964 with Sydney Allard as President. Brown served as one of the Vice Presidents.

Brown continued to race sprints into the mid-1960s, but the Fédération Internationale de Motocyclisme (FIM) would only grant licenses to riders up to 54 years of age. Brown's ambition was to record a  run on British soil. In 1966 Brown scheduled a 4-day Castrol-sponsored attempt to exceed 200 mph on a motorcycle in Britain. The runs took place at Greenham Common in Berkshire in October, one year before he would lose his racing license. During the runs several British and World records were set, but the 200 mph goal was not reached. Brown returned to Greenham Common in November for another three days of sprints, setting several new records.

Even after reaching the cut-off age for eligibility to set International records, Brown continued to race and set British records. He also campaigned to have FIM lift their 55-year age limit, writing to FIM headquarters in Geneva. FIM relented in 1968 and lifted the 55-year age limit. At 56 Brown tried to exceed 200 mph at Elvington, but was unable to reach that goal.

In 1970 Brown had the first of several heart attacks. He died in Stevenage Hertfordshire on 27 February 1979. He was survived by his wife Ada and sons Anthony and Graham.

Memorials
The George Brown Memorial Vintage Run is an event that started in 1979 and is organised by the Stevenage and District Motorcycle Club.

The George Brown Memorial Sprint is an event that is organised by the National Sprint Association. It was first held in 1982 at Santa Pod Raceway.

Records held
Over the course of his sprinting career Brown held no less than 30 national and world speed records. These records included the following.

Significant motorcycles

Cadwell Special

In the winter of 1946/47 Brown and Vincent service foreman Norman Brewster approached PCV and proposed building a Series A Comet Special for short circuit racing until a new 500 cc model was ready. PCV agreed, but restricted them to using factory surplus parts. Brown used a Comet engine and frame with serial number TTC17 as the basis of the Special. TTC17 had earlier been ridden at Donington Park by Captain Clark. The bike's name came from the location of its first outing, at Cadwell Park.

Vincent designer Philip Edward Irving (PEI) was approached by the West Ham Speedway to build an engine similar to the TTC17 Cadwell unit for speedway use. PCV and PEI designed a modified engine that used a Rapide cylinder head and barrel and a Series A engine case. All of the cooling fins were sawn off the barrel and cylinder head so that the engine would warm up quickly. The first engine had a crankcase of cast Elektron metal. Eventually the Cadwell Special itself received a Speedway engine. The Cadwell Special was sold by the factory after the Grey Flash bikes became available.

Gunga Din 

PCV determined to create a racing model out of the Rapide. A rejected engine, F10AB/1A/71.1, was sent to the development department and completely rebuilt, then mounted in a frame. The bike was soon put to use as a factory racer, as well as a test-bed for performance improvements to be applied throughout the line. This bike was named Gunga Din by motor journalist Charles Markham.

Nero 
Brown wanted to continue racing, and wanted to do it on a bike like Gunga Din. He located a Rapide in Mill Hill, North London that had been damaged in a crash and subsequent fire and bought it for £5. Brown and his brother Cliff rebuilt the wreck, and as they were no longer working for Vincent, were able to make any changes to the bike they wanted. Custom camshafts were made, and the compression ratio was raised to 13:1. Brown originally built the bike known as Nero to be a road-racing machine. The bike was raced in both solo and sidecar configurations.

In 1954 more obvious changes were made, when the rear swing-arm was replaced by one fabricated out of Velocette swing-arm legs and dampers by the Browns thanks to diagrams done by George Buck, a technical adviser at Vincent. The Vincent girdraulic front end and wheel were replaced by a telescopic fork and 19" wheel from an AJS Porcupine, courtesy of Jock West, AJS' sales director. With these modifications complete the bike's wheelbase was the same as a Norton featherbed; .

The bike underwent steady revision. The forks were AMC Teledraulic telescopics. The bike retained the box-section backbone chassis of the donor Rapide, and the 998 cc 47° Vee-twin cylinder layout. One year later the bike received 1 7/32" GP carburettors. The rear end was lowered with shorter springs, and the wheelbase was stretched an additional 2½". To handle the extra power a modified Norton clutch and seven friction plates were installed.

Brown heard about a new type of tyre called a slick being used in America. He contacted Avon Tyres and had them duplicate the American product for Nero; the first use of such tyres in Great Britain.

Brown later extended the rear swing-arm another , and extended the front rebound springs. Brown also had a streamlined fairing made for Nero; the first such use of aerodynamics on a bike in Britain. The first one built was of aluminium, and three more were made in fibreglass. They were used on both his custom bikes as well as the factory specials he also raced.

Nero replicas 
Brown built three replicas of Nero for private owners.

One was built for Frenchman Marc Bellon. Bellon contacted Brown by telegram in September 1958 about modifying his personal Rapide, which he then delivered to Brown's workshop. The bike received an AJS 7R telescopic fork and conical brake in front, and a Velocette-based swing arm with Woodhead Munroe shocks in the rear. Front and rear wheels were 19" with aluminium rims. The engine remained stock. Bellon put  on his street Nero before being called up for military duty. On his return he found the bike in an unrideable condition, which is how it remained for 20 years. In the mid-1980s he began a complete rebuild that included Mahle pistons, MkII cams and Alton generator. The Vincent backbone was replaced by a custom large-diameter tube and the steering head with a unit of solid billet. The restoration was completed in 1998.

One of the other Nero replicas was sold to a Scottish physician, who wanted to use it both on the street and in sprints. The other replica was sold to a shop-keeper in Eastbourne who kept it in regular road trim. Brown charged £450 for the conversions. Brown only built three, as most of his efforts then were going into building Super Nero.

Super Nero 
Brown's next bike was built with the goal of taking the World motorcycle land speed record. Construction started in earnest in June 1962 and the bike was first road tested in August. The team included Brown, his wife Ada, fellow sprinter Pat Barrett, and Brown's brother Cliff, who had worked on Reg Dearden's World record challenger ten years earlier.

The bike was called Super Nero, and had a supercharged engine. To provide the forced induction, Brown obtained two 1500 cc Shorrock superchargers. The engine was a Vincent 998 cc V-twin, built to Nero specs with Picador-type ground flywheels, high-lift rocker arms and Stellite cam followers. Compression was reduced to 8:1.

The first incarnation of Super Nero used the modified Model-C Vincent frame from the original Nero, whose engine was then transferred into a new factory Model C frame. Nero's long swing-arm suspension was retained. Super Nero started racing in August. In early races it was determined that boost was too low, so sprocket ratios were changed on the blower drive to increase it. Problems encountered included misfiring magnetos and breaking primary chains.

The British Drag Association invited the American Drag Association to an exhibition series in England in 1964. American drag racers would complete with their British counterparts at six airfield tracks. Before the Americans arrived Brown decided to revise Super Nero in 1963. A new, lower frame was built from 5/8" Reynolds 531 steel tube. The front forks for the new chassis came from a 70 cc Honda Super Cub, and were shortened further for use on the new Super Nero. The front wheel was 17" in height. The head-lug was modified to accept the Honda ball-races. Rake was 30°. The gearbox also served as the oil tank for the engine.

In 1965 Brown's brother Cliff built an experimental engine by boring out the mouth of the crankcase and having custom liners made for the barrel mouths so that the engine could be converted from 1000 cc to 1148 cc by inserting or removing the liners and installing the appropriate barrels and pistons. Brown built a special twin-coil ignition system for the bike as well. At this time they also discovered that the cause of their chronic misfiring was due to the batteries' plates being vibrated to destruction during the high-speed runs. The customised engine was run in Nero once at Swinderby, during which a connecting rod broke and damaged the engine, after which the engine reverted to a standard crankcase.

Both Nero and Super Nero are part of the collection in the National Motorcycle Museum in Solihull, West Midlands UK.

Super Nero Mark II
Prior to the start of the 1966 racing season another bike was built that is known as Super Nero Mark 2 (or Mark II). The tubular frame was the same as that built for Super Nero. The engine was an enlarged V-twin that displaced 1148 cc, and was supercharged as well.

Some references use the name Extra Nero, which is believed to refer to this bike.

References

Further reading

External links
 

British motorcycle designers
British motorcycle racers
Sportspeople from Nottingham
1912 births
1979 deaths